The San Beda–Letran rivalry is a multiple sport competition between two Philippine schools. This rivalry is between Mendiola's San Beda and Muralla's Letran.

Head-to-head record by sport

Seniors' Division
As of October 2016, the San Beda Red Lions has more collegiate championships in the seniors' division compared to the Letran Knights. San Beda has 112 seniors' collegiate championships while Letran has 94. Letran leads the General Championships Tally with 9 titles with San Beda having 7.

San Beda leads Letran 9–4 in different all-time sports categories.

Badminton -                        San Beda (3) - Letran (2)
Basketball -               San Beda (22) - Letran (20)
Beach Volleyball -      Letran (3)  - San Beda (2)
Chess -                            Letran (6)  - San Beda (3)
Football -                      San Beda (24) - Letran (7)
Lawn Tennis -                San Beda (16) - Letran (11)
Soft Tennis -                   San Beda (5) - Letran (none)
Softball -                      San Beda (3) - Letran (1)
Swimming -                      San Beda (32) - Letran (2)
Table Tennis -              San Beda (15) - Letran (12)
Taekwondo -                    San Beda (10) - Letran (6)
Track and Field -        Letran (6) - San Beda (none)
Volleyball -                  Letran (22) - San Beda (none)

Both schools have yet to win collegiate championships in cheerleading.

General Championship
Letran leads the General Championship race with 9–7.
Letran (9) - 1979–80, 1997–98, 1998–99, 1999–2000, 2000–01, 2001–02, 2002–03, 2003–04, 2009–10
San Beda (7) - 2010–11, 2011–2012, 2012–2013, 2015–16, 2016–2017, 2017–18, 2018–19

Juniors' Division
As of October 2016, the San Beda Red Cubs leads the rivalry in the juniors' division with 102 championships while the Letran Squires has 70 championships. The Red Cubs also leads the general championships tally with 14 compared to the Squires' 8 general championships.

San Beda leads Letran 6–5 in different all-time sports categories.
Basketball -               San Beda (23) - Letran (13)
Beach Volleyball -      Letran (1)  - San Beda (none)
Chess -                            Letran (13)  - San Beda (5)
Football -                      San Beda (16) - Letran (5)
Lawn Tennis -                San Beda (16) - Letran (7)
Softball -                      San Beda (2) - Letran (none)
Swimming -                      San Beda (22) - Letran (2)
Table Tennis -              Letran (17) - San Beda (6)
Taekwondo -                    Letran (3) - San Beda (1)
Track and Field -        San Beda (8) - Letran (6)
Volleyball -                  Letran (5) - San Beda (4)

General Championship
San Beda leads the General Championship race with 14–8.
San Beda (14) - 1982, 1988, 1989, 1990, 1991, 1993, 1995, 1996, 1997, 2013, 2014, 2015, 2016, 2017
Letran (8) - 1983, 1986, 1987, 1998, 1999, 2000, 2001, 2002

Basketball Statistics

Men's basketball results
Both teams are expected to meet at least 2 times per year.

Juniors' Basketball Results
Since 2007, San Beda leads the rivalry 28-7 but if the game on July 21, 2010, favored San Beda, San Beda will still be the leader of the rivalry but with a better record of 29–6.

Final Four Rankings
For comparison, these are the rankings of these two teams since the Final Four format was introduced.

Seniors' division

Juniors' division

See also
San Beda Red Lions
National Collegiate Athletic Association (Philippines)
Battle of Intramuros
San Beda–San Sebastian rivalry

References

External links
NCAA historical results
NCAA Season 85 Schedules and Results
NCAA Season 86 Schedules and Results
Google News Archive
Manila Bulletin Online Newspaper Archive
The LANCE - Letran College

National Collegiate Athletic Association (Philippines) rivalries
Colegio de San Juan de Letran
San Beda University